Mahushe Shongwe Reserve is a park in Mpumalanga, South Africa.

Mpumalanga Provincial Parks